Shambeckler Vui is an Australian rugby union player who plays as a Prop for the Super Rugby team the . He has also represented Australia in the under 20s team.

Super Rugby statistics

References

Australian rugby union players
Sportsmen from New South Wales
Living people
1997 births
Rugby union props
Perth Spirit players
Western Force players
New South Wales Waratahs players
Sydney (NRC team) players
ACT Brumbies players
Mitsubishi Sagamihara DynaBoars players
Black Rams Tokyo players
Rugby union players from Sydney